The pumpkin toadlet (Brachycephalus ephippium), or Spix's saddleback toad, is a small and brightly coloured species of frog in the family Brachycephalidae. It is found in Espírito Santo, Rio de Janeiro, southeastern São Paulo and southeastern Minas Gerais. Although its type specimen supposedly was collected in Bahia about 200 years ago, there are no confirmed localities in this state and recent reviews consider it more likely that it was from Rio de Janeiro. B. ephippium is locally common, quite widespread compared to most other species of Brachycephalus and it is not considered threatened.

B. ephippium feeds on tiny invertebrates and breeding is by direct development, with the female laying a few eggs on land that hatch into young toadlets (no tadpole stage).

Appearance and toxicity

Females tend to be larger than males. When newly hatched B. ephippium typically measure just .

B. ephippium is overall bright yellow-orange and this is considered aposematic (warning colours) since its skin and organs contain tetrodotoxin and similar toxins. Newly hatched B. ephippium are well-camouflaged and brown overall. 11-oxoTTX (11-oxotetrodotoxin), an isolated analogue is extremely rare to be found in other animals, even marine animals, this analogue is considered four to five times more potent than the tetrodotoxin itself. Other analogues isolated of this toad include the tetrodonic acid, 4-epipetrodotoxin, 4.9 anhydrotetrodotoxin and 11-nortetrodotoxin. The toxins can be found in their skin and ovaries, but mostly concentrated in the liver.

In 2019, scientists discovered that the head and back of this toadlet and the closely related red pumpkin toadlet (B. pitanga) glowed under ultraviolet light, due to their fluorescent skeletons. Young that have gained the bright yellow-orange adult colours still lack their fluorescence. It was initially speculated that the fluorescent colour also is aposematic or that it is related to mate choice (species recognition or determining fitness of a potential partner), but later studies indicate that the former explanation is unlikely, as predation attempts on the toadlets appear to be unaffected by the presence/absence of fluorescence.

Call and hearing
Peculiarly, this species and the closely related red pumpkin toadlet are unable to hear the frequency of their own advertising calls, as their ears are underdeveloped. Instead their communication appears to rely on certain movements like the vocal sac that inflates when calling, mouth gaping and waving of their arms. It is speculated that their calling is a vestigiality from the ancestral form of the genus, whereas their reduced hearing ability (they do have some hearing ability in frequencies outside their call) is a novel change in these species. Sounds make them more vulnerable to predators, but there has likely been little direct evolutionary pressure to lose it because of their toxicity.

See also
 Polka-dot tree frog (Hypsiboas punctatus) — the first frog discovered to be fluorescent, in 2017

References

Amphibians of Brazil
Brachycephalus
Endemic fauna of Brazil
Taxonomy articles created by Polbot
Amphibians described in 1824